Office of the Kansas Securities Commissioner is a division of the Kansas Insurance Department. The mission of the Office of the Kansas Securities Commissioner (KSC) is to protect and inform Kansas investors, to promote integrity and full disclosure by issuers and securities professionals, to investigate and prosecute fraud and to foster capital formation.

The Securities Commissioner administers the Kansas Uniform Securities Act, the Uniform Land Sales Practices Act, and the Loan Brokers Act. The Commissioner enforces these laws through administrative, civil and criminal proceedings.

History 
In 1911, Kansas became the first state to pass a law regulating the sale of investments. Lawmakers stated that the law was an attempt to prevent the sale of securities which had nothing behind them other than the "blue sky." In the next few years, over 30 states passed similar laws.

Following the great stock market crash of 1929, the federal government began to regulate investment activity with the passage of the Securities Act of 1933 and the creation of the U.S. Securities and Exchange Commission in 1934.

In 2011, the KSC and other state securities regulators celebrated the 100th (Centennial) Anniversary of the “Blue Sky” law.

Leadership 

The Office of the Kansas Securities Commissioner is administered by the Kansas Securities Commissioner.

Kansas Securities Commissioners

Services offered 

The agency regulates and monitors the securities offerings and financial services within Kansas. The staff registers securities, broker-dealers and their agents, investment advisers, loan brokers and certain land subdivisions. Agency staff investigates potential violations of the laws and ensure that registered persons and entities comply with industry, legal, and accounting standards.

To meet its mission, the KSC provides the following services:

“To protect and inform Kansas investors”
 Register securities, unless exempt
 Encourage investors to verify the licensing and registration status of salespeople and companies offering investment in Kansas
 Investigate potential violations of state securities laws and regulations
 Prosecute individuals who commit investment fraud
 Provide investor education resources to the public

“To promote integrity and full disclosure by issuers and securities professionals”
 Register broker-dealer personnel using the Central Registration Depository (CRD), a database that provides “one-stop” filing
 Register investment advisers or financial planners that manage less than $25 million in assets through the Investment Adviser Registration Depository (IARD), an electronic filing system
 Conduct record examinations of securities industry professionals to ensure their compliance with Kansas laws and regulations
 Offer continuing education opportunities to help registrants understand their regulatory obligations

“To investigate and prosecute fraud”
 Investigate investment activities originating both inside and outside of Kansas
 Work in conjunction with investigators from other states and draw upon resources of the National White Collar Crime Center (NWCCC)
 Prosecute theft and other felonies in conjunction with securities crimes

“To foster capital formation”
 Register small-company securities offerings via the Small Company Offering Registration (SCOR) process

References

External links
 Official Website
 Kansas Securities Commissioner News Releases (KGI Online Library)

State agencies of Kansas